Thomas Ivory Williams III (born August 15, 2004) is an American soccer player who plays as a defender for Orlando City in Major League Soccer.

Career

Orlando City
As a member of the Orlando City academy since 2015, Williams played 84 games and scored 8 goals across multiple age groups in four seasons with the team.

In March 2020, Williams signed an academy contract with Orlando City B, Orlando City's USL League One affiliate, ahead of the 2020 season. He made his debut on August 7, 2020, playing the full 90 minutes during a 2–0 win over New England Revolution II.

Having spent the first part of the 2021 season with the club's under-17 academy team, Williams was signed to an MLS homegrown contract by Orlando City on June 15, 2021, guaranteed through 2024, with a club option in 2025. Aged 16 years, 304 days, he became the club's youngest first-team signing, surpassing the record set by Tommy Redding in 2014. Williams had trained with the first-team during the previous two preseason camps.

Career statistics 
As of October 16, 2022

Honors
Orlando City
U.S. Open Cup: 2022

References

External links
Thomas Williams at US Soccer Development Academy
Thomas Williams at Orlando City Official Website

2004 births
Living people
Orlando City B players
Orlando City SC players
USL League One players
MLS Next Pro players
Major League Soccer players
American soccer players
United States men's youth international soccer players
Association football defenders
People from Titusville, Florida
Soccer players from Florida
Homegrown Players (MLS)